Yonah Mwesigwa Katoneene (commonly known as Bishop Yona Katoneene) was an Anglican bishop in Uganda; he was Bishop of West Ankole from 2006 to 2016.

References

21st-century Anglican bishops in Uganda
Anglican bishops of West Ankole
Uganda Christian University alumni
20th-century Anglican priests